One of the villages of Purba Bardhaman district, is 267.88 sq km. The number of people is more than two and a half million. The number of villages are 230, mauja are 123 and panchayat has 13. The entire Jamalpur stretching up to the border of the Hooghly in the south of the Memari Thana and before the Damodar river. Mainly the production-dependent area of rice, potato and rabi is the seed-rich and generous business center of the DCC. 

The communication system with different cities of the country, along with rail and road, is quite well organized. Once the Salimabad Pargana's Muslim domination would be mentioned. Again, the traditions of Jain, Buddhist and Vaishnava cultures have been found in different regions of this Thana. Celebrating Manasa, worshiping Shiva and Dharmaraj, Gazai-Uras and Mahram etc., arranges festivals, strengthening unity and harmony among the people of different communities. This is a mouza of the Jamalpur Police Station, Kollinagram, JL Nang-118. People of both non-Hindu and non-Muslim communities, like six-thousand people, live in Kulinagram under Abujahti II village panchayet. Brahmin, Kayastha, Ugra Kshtriya, Dule, Bagdi Dhivar, Indigenous people, among the people of high and low-level coexistence. Five km from the Jogram station of Howrah-Burdwan chord line in Transport. North-East and Howrah-Bardhaman Main Line is 8 km from Debipur Station. Kulingram in north-west. .

Kulingram is such a Vaisnava Pithasthan where the practice of Vaishnavism began in the pre-Sri Chaitanya era. The first wave of Bangladesh's Krishnakatha was born in this village, which was long before the birth of Sri Chaitanya in Navadwip. The person who is proud of the birthplace of Kulingram is masterpiece "Maladhar Basu" whose Father's name "Bhagirath Basu" and mother's name "Indumati Devi". He composed the work of "Sri Krishna Vijay" on the basis of Shrimad Bhagavat and Brahmavaivarta Purana. This is the first Vaishnava poem of Bengal. In Chaitanya Charitamrita, the word "Sri Krishna Vijay" is mentioned in the verse. In the fifteenth century the expression 'Sri Krisna Vijay' is a new expression of 'Shrimad  Bhagavat' as the Bengali translation of the tenth and eleventh century.

Villages in Purba Bardhaman district